Kunki (Dargwa: Кьункьи) is a rural locality (a selo) in Dakhadayevsky District, Republic of Dagestan, Russia. The population was 780 as of 2010. There are 16 streets.

Geography
Kunki is located 52 km southwest of Urkarakh (the district's administrative centre) by road. Ashty and Khuduts are the nearest rural localities.

Nationalities 
Dargins live there.

References 

Rural localities in Dakhadayevsky District